Splat-Cosmetica  (stylized as SPLAT-COSMETICA, often abbreviate SPLAT Global) is a Russian manufacturer of oral care products, household eco chemicals, and children's cosmetics. The firm is a private company started in 2000 by Evgeny Demin and Elena Belous.
The company name  comes from Spirulina platensis—among its  first products  were  cosmetics and dietary supplements containing this blue-green algae.

Around 17-20 % of its products are exported outside Russia. 
The firm does not advertise on TV but relies on word of mouth communication;  it is known for letters from the founder Evgeniy Demin that are found inside toothpaste packs.

Products 
The firm is primarily a toothpaste manufacturer (according to DSM Group, in Q1 2016 the company ranked 3 in Russia's top toothpaste manufacturers with 9,7%  market share in value and 14,7 % in volume. It  produces other oral care products. Apart from its principal brand, it has other oral care brands Iney, Innova, and Pro Whiter.

The firm also produces natural cleaning products (Biomio), baby cosmetics (Lallum Baby) and hair care products (Heya).

History 
The SPLAT brand was registered in Russia in 1994 and the Splat-Cosmetica company in 2000, when the founders rented production facilities near Moscow and started to make toothpaste. In 2006, the company launched a line of toothpastes and in 2008 an oral care foam for children.

In 2009, production moved to the Okulovsky District of Novgorod Oblast and the company started to produce dental floss, oral care foam for adults and a black toothpaste with charcoal. By 2010, the company became the number three player in the Russian toothpaste market.

The company started international expansion in 2011. It was included  in the “Global Entrepreneurship and the Successful Growth Strategies of Early-Stage Companies” report released by the World Economic Forum and Stanford University. According to the report, in 2010, the firm held a 10% share of the Russian toothpaste market and earned over 60 million USD in projected revenue.

In 2012, the company started making baby cosmetics under the trade name Lallum Baby. In 2014, it 2014 it launched ecologically sound cleaning products under the trade name Biomio, and in 2016 it began producing hair care products under the trade name Heya, and opened an office in India.

References

Cosmetics companies of Russia
Companies established in 2000
Manufacturing companies of Russia
Companies based in Moscow
Russian brands